Dying for the World is the tenth studio album by the American heavy metal band W.A.S.P., released in 2002. Dying for the World was Blackie Lawless' dedication to all those who perished in the attacks of the 9/11 events, especially heard on the "Hallowed Ground" track.

The album was written and recorded in less than a year. This is very unusual as Blackie Lawless is a perfectionist, normally taking 2 years or more to finish an album and have it recorded.

Track listing

Personnel
W.A.S.P.
Blackie Lawless – guitar, vocals, keyboards
Darrell Roberts – guitar
Mike Duda – bass, vocals 
Frankie Banali – drums

Production
Bill Metoyer – engineer, mixing
Dan Biechele – assistant engineer and production manager
Joe Delaney (a.k.a. Joetown) – additional mixing on tracks 2 and 5
Tom Baker – mastering at Precision Mastering
Kosh – album design

Charts

References

W.A.S.P. albums
2002 albums
Albums produced by Blackie Lawless